Yiewsley is a large suburban village in the London Borough of Hillingdon, England, 2 miles (3 km) south of Uxbridge, the borough's commercial and administrative centre. Yiewsley was a chapelry in the ancient parish of Hillingdon, Middlesex. The population of the ward was 12,979 at the 2011 Census.

Toponymy

Yiewsley is not recorded in the Domesday Book of 1086. The place-name is believed to be derived from the Anglo-Saxon Wifeleslēah: "Wifel's woodland clearing". The earliest written record of Yiewsley is from 1235 where it is shown as Wiuesleg in Assize Rolls.

Geography

The western side of Yiewsley lies within the Colne Valley Regional Park. Here the River Colne forms the county boundary between the London Borough of Hillingdon and Buckinghamshire. The confluence of the Frays River and River Pinn also occurs in this area and there are several man-made lakes. After climbing over the Chiltern Hills by the use of 52 locks from the Marsworth Junction, the Grand Union Canal turns east in Yiewsley to route towards London. Half a mile north of this turn, the five miles long Slough Arm of the canal leaves the Grand Union main line at the Cowley Peachey Junction, crossing over the Frays River and River Colne in aqueducts on its westward route towards the Slough basin. On the eastern side of Yiewsley lies Stockley Country Park. Within its 274 acres of parkland lies a comprehensive network of footpaths.

To the west of Yiewsley, beyond the River Colne lie the Buckinghamshire villages of Iver, Richings Park and Thorney. To the north, over the River Pinn is Cowley Peachey. To the northeast of Yiewsley is Hillingdon and the villages of Colham Green and Goulds Green. To the east lies Stockley Park and to the south, across the Great Western Railway is West Drayton.

Geology
Over tens of thousands of years the course of the River Thames moved south, first flowing to the north of Yiewsley, then over the Yiewsley area until reaching its present course today where it lies 4.8 miles (7.7 km) to the southwest of Yiewsley at its closest point. Over thousands of years the Thames deposited layers of fluvial terrace gravels, silts, sands and loams on the Middle Thames area with silts forming brickearth.

History

Stone Age

Lower and Middle Palaeolithic
Within the brickearth and gravels deposited by the Thames significant quantities of early human tools were found when commercial excavations began in Yiewsley on an industrial scale in the 19th century. The first person to start collecting artifacts from Yiewsley was John Allen Brown (1833-1903) a Fellow of the Geological Society who collected between 1889 and 1901. The principle collector was Robert Galloway Rice (1852-1933), a Fellow of the Society of Antiquaries who recorded over 2600 items from the Yiewsley area between approximately 1905 and 1929. In 1937 his collection of Lower Palaeolithic and Middle Palaeolithic artifacts was donated to the Museum of London.

In his 1978 Archaeological Report, Early Man in West Middlesex, The Yiewsley Palaeolithic sites, Palaeontologist Desmond Collins states the following with regard to the archaeological significance of the Yiewsley sites:

“..the Yiewsley pits have yielded one of the largest series of Lower Palaeolithic stone hand tools in Europe and the area remains one of the richest Palaeolithic sites in Britain.”

“A feature unique to Yiewsley is the presence in a higher level of stone tools of a Middle palaeolithic (Mousterian) date, isolated for the first time, and indicating occupation during the Neanderthal period some 70,000 years ago – a period of man's development otherwise poorly represented in the archaeology of Britain”

Bronze Age
In 1913–1914, there was the discovery of a Bronze Age urnfield cemetery with the excavation of 14 Deverel-Rimbury cinerary urns.  These and other Bronze Age items have been cataloged at the British Museum.

The Anglo-Saxon and Viking Age

The besieged Danes of Thorney Island 893 AD

In the spring of 893, after overwintering at Appledore and then plundering through Kent and Sussex, a Viking raiding army turned to head for the Danish controlled lands in the east (later known as the Danelaw). However they were intercepted by Alfred the Great's son Edward with his West Saxon Fyrd at Farnham in Surry. The Danes were routed, fleeing over the River Thames into Mercia with the West Saxon army in pursuit. Having reached the River Colne the Danes mounted a defence on what was known as Thorney Island, believed to be land between the Colne and an offshoot channel of the river between Thorney and Iver, approximately half a mile west from Yiewsley High Street today. Edward began a siege of the island and was joined by Æthelred, Lord of the Mercians with soldiers from the Mercian garrison in London. After a prolonged stalemate which may have lasted up to six months, an agreement was reached for the Danes to leave peacefully. Hostages were taken as collateral and vows made by the Danes that they would leave the Anglo-Saxon lands and go directly to the lands under Danish control which they duly did, without any of their plundered spoils.

Yiewsley (or Wifeleslēah) and the land of the Middle Saxons had been part of the Kingdom of Essex but came under Mercian control in the reign of King Æthelbald (716-757AD). By the time of the siege of Thorney Island in 893, eastern Mercia had conquered by the Danes and with his power diminished Æthelred had been forced to cede overlordship to King Alfred the Great of Wessex. When Æthelred died in 911, Middlesex was annexed by Wessex under Alfred's son, now King Edward (899-924AD). Edward would go on to take control of all of Mercia, both Angle and Danish, advancing the progression of England being united into a single kingdom.

The Norman Conquest 1066 until 1794

The Parish of Hillingdon and Colham Manor
For the majority of its existence Yiewsley was a hamlet in the Parish of St John the Baptist Church, Hillingdon, with a tenurial relationship with Colham Manor. Before the Norman Conquest, Colham Manor had belonged to Wigot of Wallingford. By the time of Domesday Book in 1086 it was the property of one of William the Conqueror's principle advisors, Roger de Montgomery.

In Colham Manor's fertile arable fields in the late 14th century, wheat was the predominant crop grown, but also rye and oats were farmed. Surplus grain was sold in London or Uxbridge. By the 12th Century Uxbridge had become the market town for the Parish of Hillingdon and it is thought by the 14th Century the town's population had exceeded that of the rest of the Parish, and this remained the case until the 1821 census. By 1600 Uxbridge was the principle Corn market for West Middlesex and much of south Buckinghamshire.

The plentiful and consistent supplies of water from the River Colne had played an important role in Hillingdon Parish becoming a flour milling centre. The Fray's River is believed to have been cut or modified from the Colne for the use of water mills by John Fray in the 15th century. A map of 1842 shows the River Colne and Frays River powering eight corn mills in the Parish. The nearest mills to Yiewsley were Colham Mill (called Lower Colham Mill from around 1746) in the south of the Parish and Yiewsley Mill which was situated on the northern side of Yiewsley Moor on the north side today's Little Britain Lake.

The oldest buildings in Yiewsley today date from the late 16th century or early 17th century and are situated at either end of Yiewsley High Street. At the northern end of the High Street is Yiewsley Grange (Also known as Brookside) which overlooks the River Pinn and is Hillingdon Manor School today. Next to Yiewsley Grange is the Six-bay Barn at Philpot's Yard (Formally Philpot's Farm). At the southern end of the High Street is the De Burgh Arms Public house, named in honour of the De Burgh family who became the Lords of Colham Manor from 1787.

The Industrial Age

The Opening of Grand Junction Canal 1794
Yiewsley's agrarian way of life started to change with the opening of the Grand Junction Canal. Construction began with cuttings on Uxbridge Moor on 1 May 1793 and in early May at Brentford and Braunston. From the Thames at Brentford to Hanwell, the canal was engineered from the River Brent. At Hanwell the canal parted from the Brent and was routed west, following the natural 100 foot contour to avoid the building of expensive and time consuming locks. It was cut through Yiewsley, turning north to follow the route of the River Colne, crossing over the Fray's River in an aqueduct at Cowley Lock.

On Monday 3 November 1794 the canal was opened between the River Thames and Uxbridge. However toll collectors weren't appointed at Uxbridge and Brentford until May 1795. It is likely the aqueduct over the Fray's River at Cowley Lock wasn't completed until the Autumn of 1795 with measures undertaken there to allow traffic to pass through. In the next year 1796, Yiewsley's first dock, Colham wharf was opened next to Colham Bridge. In 1801 the Paddington Arm of the canal opened from Bulls Bridge near Hayes and would be of national importance as a trade route into and from the Capital.

Yiewsley's brick Industry

The building of the canal enabled the bulk transportation of what became known as Cowley (or London) stock bricks, made from Yiewsley's rich deposits of brick-earth. The first record of the sale of significant numbers of bricks in Yiewsley is shown in the Public Ledger and Daily Advertiser of the 24 March 1809, advertising an auction of upwards of one million bricks owned by W.M Pope situated at a site adjoining the canal. In 1820 a branch of the canal known as Otter Dock was opened. It would become the longest of nine arms and docks that were constructed in Yiewsley to service the outgoing transportation of bricks and the importing of coal from the Midlands to fire Yiewsley's clamp kilns. The finished bricks were then transported mainly along the Grand Junction Canal to South Wharf in the Paddington Basin and to wharves along the Regent's Canal, but also to other locations along the canal and River Thames. 

Although figures for Yiewsley's brick production in the nineteenth century are not available, in July 1879 brickmaker Samuel Pocock stated at a committee of the House of Commons discussing the proposed Langley and Slough Branch of the Grand Junction canal that he had purchased his West Drayton brickfields (south of his existing Hillingdon Parish brickfields at Starveall) in March 1874 and had been making 15-20 million bricks per year. By the 1890s it is estimated 100 million bricks per year were being produced in West Middlesex supplying the demand for building materials of Victorian London. With this high production rate the deposits of brick-earth began to become depleted around the turn of the century. Brick-earth was still being extracted from Hide Field to the east of Yiewsley in 1913 but by 1930 the Stockley brickworks were producing only 2 million bricks a year. The brickworks were closed in 1935, but the underlying gravels and sands continued to be extracted until the 1970s.

The Great Western Railway and West Drayton Station (West Drayton and Yiewsley Station)
The construction of the Great Western Railway (GWR) began in 1835 and the line between Paddington and Maidenhead was opened in 1838 with West Drayton being its first station. A GWR branch line to Uxbridge Vine Street was completed in 1856. West Drayton Station was relocated east to its present position on Station Approach from Tavistock Road on the 9 April 1884, four months before a second branch line, operated by the Staines and West Drayton Railway (S&WDR) was opened on the 9 August 1884. In 1895 the station was renamed West Drayton and Yiewsley station.

Diversification of industry from the mid-1800s
By the middle of the 19th Century brick production and flour milling were Yiewsley's main industries; However new industry was beginning to develop. The Victoria oil mills near Colham Wharf was established before 1855. In 1865 it was owned by Walter Graham & Co and was producing linseed cake. A chemical works owned by Alfred White and Sons in 1890 was established by 1864 in the south of the Parish. The Hillingdon Varnish works, situated to the west of Iron Bridge Road had been established by 1868.  In June 1890 it was owned by Messrs Wilkinson, Heyward and Clark. In 1874 W. Gillespie & Co were manufacturing engines and boilers at the Foundry and Engineering Works and in 1875 Horizontal Condensing Engines were being made by Edwin Philip Bastin & Company at the Alliance Engine Works. In 1880 Edward Stewart & Co operated the West Drayton cement works and in 1890 the Electrical Engineering Corporation was making electrical equipment and Dynamos. An Indian rubber mill had been established by 1894 on Trout Road, in 1900 it was owned J.E Hopkinson & Co. In 1898 the Padcroft Saw Mills were being operated by John A. Holland. By 1900 the Rotary Photographic Company was established opposite Lower Colham Mill and in 1903 the Power Plant Co was established producing Helical Gears and couplings. In the First World War they supplied steam turbines for the Royal Navy. In 1913 the Steam Fittings Company Limited in Horton Road was producing ‘Steam traps’ to be used in Navy vessels. The company changed its name to the Drayton Regulator and Instrument Company in 1926. Also by 1913 printing works had been established on Tavistock Road and Horton Bridge Road. In 1916 C.J. Culliford & Co operated the Lithographic Printing Works. Also in 1916 the Onslow Cotton Mill was established on Trout Road. In late 1917 The West Drayton Glass Works was founded on Horton Road. In 1918 Frederick Bird & Co of the West Drayton Engineering Works also on Horton Road had been manufacturing engineering products to the Army and Navy as part of the war effort. Government contracts were also given to Squire & Son to produce glycerine and Messrs Sabey for the supply of gravel. In 1919 The Anglo-Swiss Screw Company was established on Trout Road, the same year as the S.C. Johnson & Son wax company opened their factory on the site of Colham Wharf.

In 1920 the Admiralty Engineering Laboratory was operational in the south of the Yiewsley Urban District, specializing in experimental work for the Royal Navy. During the war the Sonic laboratory had been established in the building to develop the engineering inventions of George Constantinescu. Constantinescu had begun the development the Constantinesco-Colley Fire Control Timing Gear (C.C. Gear) for synchronizing machine gun fire through aircraft propellers at his laboratory at Alperton. His system worked by using wave pulses which were generated and transmitted from a column of fluid (90% paraffin to 10% of B.B. Mobiloil or P.924 (anti-freezing) oil) instead of a system of mechanical linkages which had been used in aircraft up until then. The C.C. Gear was not only more reliable than a mechanical linkage system, but also allowed a higher rate of fire. The first working C.C. gear was air-tested in August 1916 and was fitted to No.55 Squadron's DH.4's when they arrived in France in March 1917. From November 1917 the C.C. Gear was fitted to all new British-made aircraft with synchronized guns and is considered to have played a significant role in achieving final air superiority over the Luftstreitkrafte. On Tuesday 25 March 1919 Queen Mary and Queen Marie of Romania visited the Sonic laboratory. Constantinescu was warmly congratulated by the two queens for his work.

In the 1920s Trout road developed as a centre for companies involved in oils and chemical production. In 1921 K.B Mavlankar was producing Essential Oils at the British Aromatic Chemical Works on Trout Road. From 1928 the Kenilworth Chemical Manufacturing Company and the English Metal Powder Company operated factories in Trout Road. Their factory was transferred after 1935 to the Middlesex Oil and Chemical Works Ltd, manufacturing oils, petroleum jellies, and resins. The Kenilworth Chemical and English Metal Powder companies then moved to an adjoining site in Trout Road. From the 1930s a number of smaller companies engaged in manufacturing chemicals, plastics, and engineering components were established on and around Trout Road, this would develop to being more than forty companies in the area.

Two firms began production of motor vehicles in Yiewsley after the Second World War. Road Machines of Horton Parade manufactured a range of vehicles including contractors' plant equipment and Mono-Rail transporters and in 1952 James Whitson & Co began manufacturing coaches and fire engines in Yiewsley High Street.

It would seem to be a curiosity why most of the early companies in Yiewsley chose to have West Drayton as their business address, as they were neither in West Drayton nor in the Parish of West Drayton. West Drayton remained a largely rural village until into the 20th Century and then developed into a mostly residential area. A possible answer to this is that railway station had been called West Drayton station since its opening in 1838 and only changed to West Drayton and Yiewsley in 1895. With the Railways becoming the principal form of transportation in the latter half of the 19th century, it would appear businesses believed it was commercially advantageous to adopt West Drayton as their address.

Decline in railway usage
By the 1960s the demand for rail travel was falling. The branch line to Uxbridge Vine St was particularly affected by competition from the town's London Underground lines. Passenger services to Uxbridge were stopped in 1962, however a short section of line (approximately 745 yards) to the Middlesex Oil and Chemical Works on Trout Road continued in use for freight services until 8 January 1979. The Staines line was closed to passengers in 1965 as a consequence of 1963 report ‘The Reshaping of British Railways’ by Dr Richard Beeching, Chairman of the British Railways Board (BRB). The line continues to be used for freight services as far as Colnbrook.

Another consequence of the Beeching report was the closure of over 2000 railway stations across Great Britain. From 1968 until 1980 a policy was adopted by the British Railways Board to shorten the remaining stations' names where possible. This policy resulted in Yiewsley being removed from the station name after 79 years on the 6 May 1974.

Political development

Yiewsley today

Yiewsley today is a growing community with both residential housing and commercial businesses. With the establishment of the Elizabeth line and as a consequence of the London Plan and Hillingdon Local Plan there has been significant construction of residential apartments on former industrial and manufacturing sites. Yiewsley has an active High Street with national retail outlets Tesco, Wilko, Iceland and Aldi situated on or adjacent to it. Together with local businesses in Yiewsley and Uxbridge, Heathrow airport is a major source of employment in the area.

Public services
Yiewsley Library is situated on Yiewsley High Street.
P3 Navigator is an Advice centre for young people on Fairfield Road.
Yiewsley Health Centre on Yiewsley High Street and incorporates The High Street Practice  and the Yiewsley Family Practice.
Otterfield Medical Centre is situated on Otterfield Road.
West Drayton and Yiewsley Dental provide NHS dental care and is situated on Providence Road.

Education
Primary schools in Yiewsley:
 St Matthew's CE Primary School
 Rabbsfarm Primary School

Secondary school:
Park Academy West London

Special and Alternative schools:
 Hillingdon Manor School, Yiewsley Grange
 The Young People's Academy
 The Skills Hub

Political representation
Yiewsley's Member of Parliament is Boris Johnson MP 
Yiewsley's elected representative in the London Assembly is Dr Onkar Sahota AM
The Yiewsley ward councillors in the Hillingdon Borough Council are:
Councillor Naser Mohammed Issa Abby 
Councillor Sital Punja

St Matthew's parish church

Until the mid-19th century, Yiewsley was a district of the parish of St John the Baptist church, Hillingdon. After the opening of the brick-fields, Yiewsley's population started to grow, and work began to provide for the building of a Mission Church (also referred to as a chapel of ease). St Matthew's Church was designed by Sir George Gilbert Scott and was consecrated on 6 July 1859. Yiewsley became a separate ecclesiastical parish in 1874.

With the population of Yiewsley continuing to grow in the latter years of the 19th century, more room was required in the church. Architect Sir Charles Nicholson was consulted to design the enlargement to the church and its foundation stone was laid on 24 September 1897. The Church was consecrated by the Bishop of London on 25 April 1898.

Yiewsley War Memorial stands in the grounds of St Matthew's Church. It was unveiled on Saturday 28 May 1921 by Lady Delia Peel in honour of the 128 men of the parish who fell in the Great War. Her husband, Yiewsley's Member of Parliament Col. Hon. Sidney Peel, gave an address to the assembled people of Yiewsley before the unveiling. In the address he stated that the population of Yiewsley at the time was something under 5,000, but more than 530 men of the parish had served in His Majesty's Army during the war – more than one in ten of the whole population of the place including women and children. Before closing his address with the names of the men inscribed on the memorial, he stated that it had been put there in order that the people of Yiewsley in time to come might bring their children to it and point out to them the names of father, grandfather or some other relative and tell them of the great things that were done by their predecessors so that it might be an inspiration and hope for the future.

On Sunday 4 October 2009 the war memorial was rededicated by Peter Broadbent, the Bishop of Willesden, to include the names of the 73 men of the parish who fell in the Second World War. A ceremony with the laying of wreaths is held at the War Memorial on Remembrance Sunday each year.

Culture and recreation

The Yiewsley and West Drayton Arts Council maintain the Southlands Arts Centre in West Drayton. They oversee events and promote local creativity. There are many exhibitions, music festivals, and creative endeavours from fine arts, photography, film-making and music groups.
Community events are held at Yiewsley's three churches, St Matthew's Parish Church, Yiewsley Baptist Church and Yiewsley Methodist church. Events are also held at the Yiewsley and West Drayton Community centre in West Drayton.
The Outline Community Theatre Company is based at St Matthews Church and stages productions of both modern and classic theatre in the local area.
The Hillingdon Theatre Dance Centre has its studio on Yiewsley High Street.
The Yiewsley and West Drayton Band is a second section brass band established in 1890 and maintains a year-round programme of concerts and community events. 
1381 Squadron (West Drayton & Yiewsley) Royal Air Force Air Cadets are based at Summer Drive, West Drayton.  
Yiewsley Recreation Ground is situated between Falling Lane and Yiewsley High Street. 
Stockley Country Park has a network of footpaths in its 274 acres of parkland. There are views across the local area and there is an 18-hole golf course. The Gould Green Riding School provides horse riding lessons in the park. 
The London Loop, Beeches Way, The Celandine route, Shakespeare's Way, the Colne Valley Trail and The Grand Union Canal walk route along the footpaths, bridleways and canal towpaths in Yiewsley.
Uxbridge F.C. established 1871, are one of the oldest football clubs in the south of England. They play at Honeycroft on Horton Road.
Thorney Weir the Mets and Lizard Lakes fishery have coarse fishing in their lakes in Yiewsley.
The Grand Union Canal gives boating access to the network of canals and rivers of England. Canalside moorings are available through Yiewsley with the nearest marina being the Packet Boat Marina at Cowley Peachey. High Line Yachting operate boatyards on the Grand Union Mainline at Cowley Peachey and on the Grand Union Slough Arm at Iver.

Commerce

Yiewsley's main commercial area is on and adjacent to Horton Road. There are over 70 businesses located here including the Speedfit manufacturer John Guest (RWC Ltd) and the data centre company Virtus, who have the UK's largest data centre campus at Prologis Park West London. New Pro Foundries in Horton Close have produced the bronze BAFTA awards. Continental Tyres have their UK Head office, Continental House on Yiewsley High Street.

Transport

Rail
West Drayton railway station is located at the southern end of Yiewsley High Street and is on the Great Western Main Line. The Elizabeth line operates a stopping service between Abbey Wood and Reading and Great Western Railway (GWR) operates a stopping service between London Paddington and Didcot Parkway.

Road

Yiewsley is served by the nearby M4 and M25 motorways which lie a little over a mile to its south and west respectively. The A408 Stockley Road dual carriageway on the eastern side of Yiewsley acts as a by-pass road, avoiding the village centre.

Buses

There are regular London bus services from Yiewsley to Uxbridge, Hayes,  Ruislip, Hounslow and to the Heathrow Airport Terminals.

Air

Heathrow Airport lies 2.5 miles (4 km) south of Yiewsley.

Notable people

 Ronnie Wood, guitarist in rock bands The Rolling Stones and Faces, grew up in Whitethorn Avenue, attending St Stephen's Infant School and St Matthew's Church of England Primary School.
Art Wood (1937-2006), vocalist of the Sixties rhythm and blues group The Artwoods grew up in Whitethorn Avenue.
 Ted Wood (1939-2003), Traditional Jazz vocalist and drummer was born in Yiewsley, growing up in Whitehorn Avenue.
 Musician Kim Gardner (1948–2001), of The Birds, The Creation and Ashton, Gardner and Dyke, grew up in Yiewsley.
 Cinematographer Wally Gentleman (1926–2001), whose credits include the special effects on 2001: A Space Odyssey and Universe, was born in Yiewsley.
 George Thomas Moore Marriott (1885-1949) regarded as one of the best stage and screen character actors of his generation was born in Alpha Place, High Street, Yiewsley.

References

External links

Yiewsley website
 Southlands Arts Centre website

Areas of London
Districts of the London Borough of Hillingdon
Places formerly in Middlesex
District centres of London